The Ghost Who Walks is the debut album from British supermodel and singer-songwriter Karen Elson. Elson told DJ Steve Lamacq: "The title was a nickname that I had at school. It was one of the nicer nicknames I had for being tall, pale and a little bit haunted."

The lead single from the album is title song, "The Ghost Who Walks".

Tracks
"The Ghost Who Walks" (Elson)
"The Truth Is in the Dirt" (Elson)
"Pretty Babies" (Elson, Garniez)
"Lunasa" (Garniez)
"100 Years from Now" (Elson, Garniez, Bojadziev)
"Stolen Roses" (Elson)
"Cruel Summer" (Elson)
"Garden" (Elson)
"The Birds They Circle" (Elson)
"A Thief at My Door" (Elson)
"The Last Laugh" (Elson)
"Mouths to Feed" (Elson, Garniez)
"In Trouble with the Lord" (Elson) (iTunes bonus track)

Chart performance

Album Charts

Singles Charts

References

External links
Official site

2010 debut albums
Karen Elson albums
XL Recordings albums
Albums produced by Jack White
Third Man Records albums